Baba Garibnath Dham (बाबा गरीबनाथ धाम) is a holy sacred place of Hinduism in Muzaffarpur in the  Indian state of Bihar. Baba Garib Dham is one of the oldest temples of Lord Shiva and known as the Deoghar of Bihar. Devotees from all across the district and state come here to pray and wish for their better life ahead, It is believed that prayer during the month of Sawan has special significance, which helps to fulfill all wishes.

This temple is a place of pilgrimage and tourists.

History 
According to religious beliefs, Baba Garibnath Dham has a history of about three hundred years. It is believed that earlier there was a dense forest and there were seven Peepal Tree in between. It is said that at the time of the cutting of these trees, blood-red substances started coming out and a huge Shivling was found here. People tell that Baba appeared in the land owner's dream, since then worship is being here.

Location
Baba Garib Asthan is located near Purani bazar in Muzaffarpur.

Nearby Railway Station:- Muzaffarpur jn. (MFP)

Nearby Bus Stand:- Imlichatti, Muzaffarpur

People can also take other public transport via road, such as auto rikshaw or e-rickshaw.

References

Hindu temples in Bihar
Buildings and structures in Muzaffarpur
Shiva temples in Bihar